Perfect Match (in Chinese 最佳男朋友) is a 1989 Hong Kong romantic comedy film directed by Dennis Chan and starring Andy Lau, George Lam and Carol Cheng.

Plot
In the boardrooms and hallways of the fiercely competitive "Lok's Toy Company", where employees vie for the top management position while trading verbal barbs and romantic overtures. According to the passed director of the Lok's Toy Company, his properties were divided to his niece Lok Ka Kei and nephew Lok Ka Sing. However, Sing's share will be temporarily held by Kei until she marries. Sing then sends his followers to date Kei and hopes she will soon get married. However, all of them fail because Kei falls in love with the company's chief designer Peter Lai. Finally, after solving certain misunderstandings, Sing realizes his fault and decides to run the business on his own.

Cast
Andy Lau as Lok Ka Sing
George Lam as Peter Lai
Carol Cheng as Lok Ka Kei
Ellen Chan as Salina
David Wu as David Shek
Meg Lam as Mrs. Peter Lai
Shing Fui-On as Joseph
Manfred Wong as Ka Wei
Yiu Yau Hung as Q
Wai Kei Shun as Uncle Chu
Chingmy Yau as Gynaecologist
Soh Hang-suen as Mrs. Lam
Natalis Chan as Security guard
Wong Jing as Security guard
Charlie Cho as Security guard
Lo Fan as Guest at Mr. Lok's funeral
Dennis Chan as Dr. Dennis Kwong
Alex Ng as Chauffeur Sing
Frankie Chan as Muscle customer of hawker stall
Jim James as Funeral attendee
Ernest Mauser as Funeral attendee

Box office
The film grossed HK11,583,955 at the Hong Kong box office during its theatrical run from 17 March to 12 April 1989 in Hong Kong.

See also
Andy Lau filmography
Wong Jing filmography

External links

Perfect Match at Hong Kong Cinemagic

1989 films
1989 romantic comedy films
Hong Kong romantic comedy films
1980s Cantonese-language films
Films set in Hong Kong
Films shot in Hong Kong
1980s Hong Kong films